Begonia samhaensis is a species in the family Begoniaceae. Similar to Begonia socotrana but separated by the asymmetrically ovate leaves and the unequal tepals in the male flowers; outer tepals broadly orbicular, 1.5–2.2 × 1.7–2.5 cm; inner obovate elliptic, 1.4–2.0 × 0.8 × 1.4 cm.

Ecology
Damp and shady cracks in north-facing limestone cliffs,  on the island of Samhah in the Socotra Archipelago, Yemen.
Grows on north facing cliffs on the summit pinnacle and escarpments of the limestone plateau at the centre of Samhah island. Its area of occupation is less than 10 km2. The cliffs where it grows catch precipitation and mists principally from the NE monsoon and represent a unique habitat on Samhah island.

Botanical notes
Unlike B. socotrana, B. samhaensis flowers after rain and is not reliant on short day-length.

References

External links

Endemic flora of Socotra
samhaensis
Plants described in 2002